The CSA Steaua București Boxing section  was created in 1947 and is one of the most successful boxing teams in Romania.

Achievements

European champions

Notable boxers

 Vasile Tiță
 Gheorghe Fiat
 Mircea Dobrescu
 Gheorghe Negrea
 Alec Năstac
 Dumitru Șchiopu
 Viorel Simion

Notable coaches
 Gheorghe Fiat

References

External links
 Official CSA Steaua website
 Club website

boxing
Sports clubs established in 1947